Gerard James Sexton (4 April 1925 – 24 April 2006) was an Australian rules footballer who played with Footscray in the Victorian Football League (VFL).

His son, Damian later played for St Kilda in the Australian Football League. The almost 45 year gap between Gerry's last game and Damian's first game is the longest ever in the league for a father and son.

Gerry Sexton had three nephews play at AFL clubs, Michael Sexton (Carlton 200 games), Ben Sexton (Footscray 39 games & Carlton 4 games) and Stephen Sexton (Carlton reserves).

Notes

External links 

1925 births
2006 deaths
Australian rules footballers from Victoria (Australia)
Western Bulldogs players